dBase (also stylized dBASE) was one of the first database management systems for microcomputers and the most successful in its day. The dBase system includes the core database engine, a query system, a forms engine, and a programming language that ties all of these components together. dBase's underlying file format, the  file, is widely used in applications needing a simple format to store structured data.

Originally released as Vulcan for PTDOS in 1978, the CP/M port caught the attention of Ashton-Tate in 1980. They licensed it and re-released it as dBASE II, and later ported it to IBM PC computers running DOS. On the PC platform, in particular, dBase became one of the best-selling software titles for a number of years. A major upgrade was released as dBase III, and ported to a wider variety of platforms, adding UNIX, and VMS. By the mid-1980s, Ashton-Tate was one of the "big three" software publishers in the early business software market, the others being Lotus Development and WordPerfect.

Starting in the mid-1980s, several companies produced their own variations on the dBase product and especially the dBase programming language. These included FoxBASE+ (later renamed FoxPro), Clipper, and other so-called xBase products. Many of these were technically stronger than dBase, but could not push it aside in the market. This changed with the poor reception of dBase IV, whose design and stability were so lacking that many users switched to other products. At the same time, database products increasingly used the IBM-invented SQL (Structured Query Language). Another factor was user adoption of Microsoft Windows on desktop computers. The shift toward SQL and Windows put pressure on the makers of xBase products to invest in major redesign to provide new capabilities.

In the early 1990s, xBase products constituted the leading database platform for implementing business applications. The size and impact of the xBase market did not go unnoticed, and within one year, the three top xBase firms were acquired by larger software companies:
 Borland purchased Ashton-Tate
 Microsoft bought Fox Software
 Computer Associates acquired Nantucket

By the opening decade of the 21st century, most of the original xBase products had faded from prominence and many disappeared entirely. Products known as dBase still exist, owned by dBase LLC.

History

Origins

In the late 1960s, Fred Thompson at the Jet Propulsion Laboratory (JPL) was using a Tymshare product named RETRIEVE to manage a database of electronic calculators, which were at that time very expensive products. In 1971, Thompson collaborated with Jack Hatfield, a programmer at JPL, to write an enhanced version of RETRIEVE which became the JPLDIS project. JPLDIS was written in FORTRAN on the UNIVAC 1108 mainframe, and was presented publicly in 1973. When Hatfield left JPL in 1974, Jeb Long took over his role.

While working at JPL as a contractor, C. Wayne Ratliff entered the office football pool. He had no interest in the game as such, but felt he could win the pool by processing the post-game statistics found in newspapers. In order to do this, he turned his attention to a database system and, by chance, came across the documentation for JPLDIS. He used this as the basis for a port to PTDOS on his kit-built IMSAI 8080 microcomputer, and called the resulting system Vulcan (after Mr. Spock on Star Trek).

Ashton-Tate

George Tate and Hal Lashlee had built two successful start-up companies: Discount Software, which was one of the first to sell PC software programs through the mail to consumers, and Software Distributors, which was one of the first wholesale distributors of PC software in the world. They entered into an agreement with Ratliff to market Vulcan, and formed Ashton-Tate (the name Ashton chosen purely for marketing reasons) to do so. Ratliff ported Vulcan from PTDOS to CP/M. Hal Pawluk, who handled marketing for the nascent company, decided to change the name to the more business-like "dBase". Pawluk devised the use of lower case "d" and all-caps "BASE" to create a distinctive name. Pawluk suggested calling the new product version two ("II") to suggest it was less buggy than an initial release. dBase II was the result and became a standard CP/M application along with WordStar and SuperCalc.

In 1981, IBM commissioned a port of dBase for the then-in-development PC. The resultant program was one of the initial pieces of software available when the IBM PC went on sale the fall of 1981. dBase was one of a very few "professional" programs on the platform at that time, and became a huge success. The customer base included not only end-users, but an increasing number of "value added resellers", or VARs, who purchased dBase, wrote applications with it, and sold the completed systems to their customers. The May 1983 release of dBase II RunTime further entrenched dBase in the VAR market by allowing the VARs to deploy their products using the lower-cost RunTime system.

Although some critics stated that dBase was difficult to learn, its success created many opportunities for third parties. By 1984, more than 1,000 companies offered dBase-related application development, libraries of code to add functionality, applications using dBase II Runtime, consulting, training, and how-to books. A company in San Diego (today known as Advisor Media) premiered a magazine devoted to professional use of dBase, Data Based Advisor; its circulation exceeded 35,000 after eight months. All of these activities fueled the rapid rise of dBase as the leading product of its type.

dBase III

As platforms and operating systems proliferated in the early 1980s, the company found it difficult to port the assembly language-based dBase to target systems. This led to a re-write of the platform in the C programming language, using automated code conversion tools. The resulting code worked, but was essentially undocumented and inhuman in syntax, a problem that would prove to be serious in the future.

In May 1984, the rewritten dBase III was released. Although reviewers widely panned its lowered performance, the product was otherwise well reviewed. After a few rapid upgrades, the system stabilized and was once again a best-seller throughout the 1980s, and formed the famous "application trio" of PC compatibles (dBase, Lotus 123, and WordPerfect). By the fall of 1984, the company had over 500 employees and was taking in US$40 million a year in sales (equivalent to $ million in ), the vast majority from dBase products.

Cloning 
There was also an unauthorized clone of dBase III called Rebus in the Soviet Union. Its adaptation to the Russian language was reduced to the mechanical replacement of the name, the russification of the help files and the correction of the sorting tables for the Russian language.

dBase IV
Introduced in 1988, after delays,
dBase IV had "more than 300 new or improved features". By then, FoxPro had made inroads,
and even dBase IV's  support for Query by Example and SQL were not enough.

Along the way, Borland, which had bought Ashton Tate, brought out a revised dBase IV in 1992 but with a focus described as "designed for programmers" rather than "for ordinary users".

Recent version history

dBASE product range

dBase, LLC products
dBASE PLUS: A Windows-based database.
dBASE 2019: Successor of dBASE PLUS 12. Requires Windows Vista or later. Only 32-bit Windows Vista is supported, but 32 and 64-bit Windows Server 2012 are supported.
dBASE CLASSIC: dBASE V for DOS without DOS emulator, originally found in dBASE PLUS 9. Also includes original documentation included in the installation in PDF format.
dbDOS: A MS-DOS emulator.
dbDOS PRO: Successor of dbDOS 1.5.1, starts with version 2.
dbDOS Open Source: Open source version of dbDOS.
dbDOSv: Successor of dbDOS PRO 7.
dbfUtilities: .dbf file processing utilities.
dbfCompare: Compares differences between tables.
dbfExport: Converts .dbf table to other file formats.
dbfImport: Converts other file formats into .dbf format.
dbfInspect: Read, modify, insert, delete, pack, and print using any dBASE IV and later tables.

SQL Utilities
dumpSQL: Extracts all of the records of an existing table into a new table in the supported file formats.
moveSQL: Transfers all of the records of an existing table into a new table in the supported database formats.

dBase / xBase programming language

For handling data, dBase provided detailed procedural commands and functions to

 open and traverse records in data files (e.g., USE, SKIP, GO TOP, GO BOTTOM, and GO recno), 
 manipulate field values (REPLACE and STORE), and 
 manipulate text strings (e.g., STR() and SUBSTR()), numbers, and dates.

dBase is an application development language and integrated navigational database management system which Ashton-Tate labeled as "relational" but it did not meet the criteria defined by Dr. Edgar F. Codd's relational model. It used a runtime interpreter architecture, which allowed the user to execute commands by typing them in a command line "dot prompt". Similarly, program scripts (text files with PRG extensions) ran in the interpreter (with the DO command).

Over time, Ashton-Tate's competitors introduced so-called clone products and compilers that had more robust programming features such as user-defined functions (UDFs), arrays for complex data handling. Ashton-Tate and its competitors also began to incorporate SQL, the ANSI/ISO standard language for creating, modifying, and retrieving data stored in relational database management systems.

Eventually, it became clear that the dBase world had expanded far beyond Ashton-Tate. A "third-party" community formed, consisting of Fox Software, Nantucket, Alpha Software, Data Based Advisor Magazine, SBT and other application development firms, and major developer groups. Paperback Software launched the flexible and fast VP-Info with a unique built-in compiler. The community of dBase variants sought to create a dBase language standard, supported by IEEE committee X3J19 and initiative IEEE 1192. They said "xBase" to distinguish it from the Ashton-Tate product.

Ashton-Tate saw the rise of xBase as an illegal threat to its proprietary technology. In 1988 they filed suit against Fox Software and Santa Cruz Operation (SCO) for copying dBase's "structure and sequence" in FoxBase+ (SCO marketed XENIX and UNIX versions of the Fox products). In December 1990, U.S. District judge Terry Hatter Jr. dismissed Ashton-Tate's lawsuit and invalidated Ashton-Tate's copyrights for not disclosing that dBase had been based, in part, on the public domain JPLDIS. In October 1991, while the case was still under appeal, Borland International acquired Ashton-Tate, and as one of the merger's provisions the U.S. Justice Department required Borland to end the lawsuit against Fox and allow other companies to use the dBase/xBase language without the threat of legal action.

By the end of 1992, major software companies raised the stakes by acquiring the leading xBase products. Borland acquired Ashton-Tate's dBase products (and later WordTech's xBase products), Microsoft acquired Fox Software's FoxBASE+ and FoxPro products, and Computer Associates acquired Nantucket's Clipper products. Advisor Media built on its Data Based Advisor magazine by launching FoxPro Advisor and Clipper Advisor (and other) developer magazines and journals, and live conferences for developers. However, a planned dBase Advisor Magazine was aborted due to the market failure of dBase IV.

By the year 2000, the xBase market had faded as developers shifted to new database systems and programming languages. Computer Associates (later known as CA) eventually dropped Clipper. Borland restructured and sold dBase. Of the major acquirers, Microsoft stuck with xBase the longest, evolving FoxPro into Visual FoxPro, but the product is no longer offered. In 2006 Advisor Media stopped its last-surviving xBase magazine, FoxPro Advisor. The era of xBase dominance has ended, but there are still xBase products. The dBase product line is now owned by dBase LLC which currently sells dBASE PLUS 12.3 and a DOS-based dBASE CLASSIC (dbDOS to run it on 64-bit Windows).

Some open source implementations are available, such as Harbour, xHarbour, and Clip.

In 2015, a new member of the xBase family was born: the XSharp (X#) language, maintained as an open source project with a compiler, its own IDE, and Microsoft Visual Studio integration. XSharp produces .NET assemblies and uses the familiar xBase language. The XSharp product was originally created by a group of four enthusiasts who have worked for the Vulcan.NET project in the past. The compiler is created on top of the Roslyn compiler code, the code behind the C# and VB compilers from Microsoft.

Programming examples 
Today, implementations of the dBase language have expanded to include many features targeted for business applications, including object-oriented programming, manipulation of remote and distributed data via SQL, Internet functionality, and interaction with modern devices.

The following example opens an employee table ("empl"), gives every manager who supervises 1 or more employees a 10-percent raise, and then prints the names and salaries.
 USE empl
 REPLACE ALL salary WITH salary * 1.1 FOR supervisors > 0
 LIST ALL fname, lname, salary TO PRINT
 * (comment: reserved words shown in CAPITALS for illustration purposes)
Note how one does not have to keep mentioning the table name. The assumed ("current") table stays the same until told otherwise. Because of its origins as an interpreted interactive language, dBase used a variety of contextual techniques to reduce the amount of typing needed. This facilitated incremental, interactive development but also made larger-scale modular programming difficult. A tenet of modular programming is that the correct execution of a program module must not be affected  by external factors such as the state of memory variables or tables being manipulated in other program modules. Because dBase was not designed with this in mind, developers had to be careful about porting (borrowing) programming code that assumed a certain context and it would make writing larger-scale modular code difficult. Work-area-specific references were still possible using the arrow notation ("B->customer") so that multiple tables could be manipulated at the same time. In addition, if the developer had the foresight to name their tables appropriately, they could clearly refer to a large number of tables open at the same time by notation such as ("employee->salary") and ("vacation->start_date"). Alternatively, the alias command could be appended to the initial opening of a table statement which made referencing a table field unambiguous and simple. For example. one can open a table and assign an alias to it in this fashion, "use EMP alias Employee", and henceforth, refer to table variables as "Employee->Name".

Another notable feature is the re-use of the same clauses for different commands. For example, the FOR clause limits the scope of a given command. (It is somewhat comparable to SQL's WHERE clause.) Different commands such as LIST, DELETE, REPLACE, BROWSE, etc. could all accept a FOR clause to limit (filter) the scope of their activity. This simplifies the learning of the language.

dBase was also one of the first business-oriented languages to implement string evaluation.
 i = 2
 myMacro = "i + 10"
 i = &myMacro
 * comment: i now has the value 12
Here the "&" tells the interpreter to evaluate the string stored in "myMacro" as if it were programming code. This is an example of a feature that made dBase programming flexible and dynamic, sometimes called "meta ability" in the profession. This could allow programming expressions to be placed inside tables, somewhat reminiscent of formulas in spreadsheet software.

However, it could also be problematic for pre-compiling and for making programming code secure from hacking. But, dBase tended to be used for custom internal applications for small and medium companies where the lack of protection against copying, as compared to compiled software, was often less of an issue.

Interactivity 
In addition to the dot-prompt, dBase III, III+, and IV came packaged with an ASSIST application to manipulate data and queries, as well as an APPSGEN application which allowed the user to generate applications without resorting to code writing, like a 4GL. The dBase IV APPSGEN tool was based largely on portions of an early CP/M product named Personal Pearl.

Niches 
Although the language has fallen out of favor as a primary business language, some find dBase an excellent interactive ad hoc data manipulation tool. Whereas SQL retrieves data sets from a relational database (RDBMS), with dBase one can more easily manipulate, format, analyze and perform calculations on individual records, strings, numbers, and so on in a step-by-step imperative (procedural) way instead of trying to figure out how to use SQL's declarative operations.

Its granularity of operations is generally smaller than SQL, making it easier to split querying and table processing into easy-to-understand and easy-to-test parts. For example, one could insert a BROWSE operation between the filtering and the aggregation step to study the intermediate table or view (applied filter) before the aggregation step is applied.

As an application development platform, dBase fills a gap between lower-level languages such as C, C++, and Java, and high-level proprietary 4GLs (fourth generation languages) and purely visual tools, providing relative ease-of-use for business people with less formal programming skill and high productivity for professional developers willing to trade off the low-level control.

dBase remained a popular teaching tool even after sales slowed because the text-oriented commands were easier to present in printed training material than the mouse-oriented competitors. Mouse-oriented commands were added to the product over time, but the command language remained a popular de facto standard, while mousing commands tended to be vendor-specific.

File formats 
A major legacy of dBase is its  file format, which has been adopted in a number of other applications. For example, the shapefile format, developed by ESRI for spatial data in its PC ArcInfo geographic information system, uses .dbf files to store feature attribute data.

Microsoft recommends saving a Microsoft Works database file in the dBase file format so that it can be read by Microsoft Excel.

A package is available for Emacs to read xbase files.

LibreOffice and OpenOffice Calc can read and write all generic dbf files.

dBase's database system was one of the first to provide a header section for describing the structure of the data in the file. This meant that the program no longer required advance knowledge of the data structure, but rather could ask the data file how it was structured. There are several variations on the .dbf file structure, and not all dBase-related products and .dbf file structures are compatible.  VP-Info is unique in that it can read all variants of the dbf file structure.

A second filetype is the  file format for memo fields. While character fields are limited to 254 characters each, a memo field is a 10-byte pointer into a  file which can include a much larger text field. dBase was very limited in its ability to process memo fields, but some other xBase languages such as Clipper treated memo fields as strings just like character fields for all purposes except permanent storage.

Some xBase languages such as VP-Info include compatibility with  files while others use different file formats such as  used by Clipper and  used by FoxPro or FlagShip. Later iterations of Clipper included drivers for  indexes.

Reception
Jerry Pournelle in July 1980 called Vulcan "infuriatingly excellent" because the software was powerful but the documentation was poor. He praised its speed and sophisticated queries, but said that "we do a lot of pounding at the table and screaming in rage at the documentation".

References

External links 
 
 xBase (and dBase) File Format Description

1979 software
Borland software
CP/M software
Database-related software for Linux
Desktop database application development tools
DOS software
Microcomputer software
Proprietary database management systems
Assembly language software
XBase programming language family